Robert F. Howard (1883-1963) was an educator, pecan farmer, and cattle-rancher who founded the FarmHouse college fraternity.

Howard attended the University of Missouri, where he was one of seven founding members of FarmHouse fraternity in 1905. He received a B.S. in Agriculture from the school in 1908. He received a M.S. in Agriculture 1912 while teaching at the University of Nebraska.

Howard was a professor and chairman of the Department of Horticulture at the University of Nebraska from 1914-24 after teaching previously at the University of Missouri, University of Nebraska, and University of Wisconsin–Madison.

He moved to Wharton, Texas, in 1924, where he ran a  ranch with cattle and thousands of pecan trees. He was involved in many local and statewide civic organizations and initiatives in Texas for the last 40 years of his life.

References
 Material pulled from the records of FarmHouse International Fraternity, Inc.

University of Missouri alumni
University of Missouri faculty
University of Nebraska–Lincoln alumni
University of Nebraska–Lincoln faculty
1883 births
1963 deaths
FarmHouse founders